Whitfield is an agricultural township in the King Valley in north-eastern Victoria.

Overview 
The township is immediately west of the flood-prone King River and has State Forest to its west and east. Agriculture extends along several stream valleys which are tributaries of the King River.

History
Pastoral runs were established in the area in the 1840s but population was small until the 1870s, the Post Office opening on 1 May 1874 as Upper King River and being renamed Whitfield in 1889. The name Whitfield is believed to come from the name of a pastoral run Whitefields. In the early 1900s Whitfield was the site of a Government experimental farm growing tobacco and hops. After World War II many European immigrants settled in the area and grew tobacco.

Today
The township is close to nearby Cheshunt, Victoria, and the localities of Rose River and Dandongadale. Local places of interest include Paradise Falls, Mount Cobbler, Power's Lookout, Lake William Hovell and Wabonga Plateau. Waterfalls, mountain streams, wildflowers and views of the Alps are features of the Wabonga Plateau-Mount Cobbler area of the Alpine National Park. There are tours and places of interest for day visitors as well as those staying longer. Bushwalking, 4WD touring and camping are offered in the area.

Mount Cobbler and the Wabonga Plateau area of the Alpine National Park are often approached from Whitfield. From Melbourne, Whitfield can be reached via the Hume Highway to Wangaratta or via the Maroondah Highway to Mansfield and then via Tolmie. Roads from Benalla, Mansfield and Myrtleford.

Whitfield has a number of facilities as the principal town of the  upper King Valley.  It has a hotel/pub, Cafe Whitty (coffee shop & food), police station, golf course and caravan park. It is home of the King Valley football team competing in the Ovens and King Football League.

Tragedy struck the township when the only general store in town (which had recently been taken over by new owners) was destroyed in a fire early in 2013.

Transport 

There is a link between Whitfield and Melbourne's tourist railway Puffing Billy. In 1897 the Victorian Railways accepted the tender from the Baldwin Locomotive Works, Philadelphia, U.S.A. for narrow-gauge locomotives of the ‘A’ Class, (two 2 foot 6 inch-gauge locomotives) and the first two to be received were placed on the Whitfield/Wangaratta line construction project.  Thus the line has the distinction of being the first narrow-gauge line to be built in Victoria.  Some of the whistle stop name-boards such as Angleside, Claremont, Dwyer, Pieper and Jarrott can still be seen. There is now a bus service that has replaced the old train system, still taking the same route in and out of Wangaratta. The bus runs on Monday, Wednesday and Friday.

References

External links 

 Geoscience Australia Place names search: Whitfield

Towns in Victoria (Australia)
Rural City of Wangaratta